Cyrtodactylus celatus is a species of gecko that is endemic to West Timor.

References 

Cyrtodactylus
Reptiles described in 2014